Grandview Drive (sometimes spelled Grand View Drive) is a two and a half mile scenic road with adjacent park areas through Peoria and Peoria Heights, Illinois.  Major portions of the road give a view of the Illinois River and its valley as well as clear views of some of the most prestigious and historic homes in the area.  Houses along Grandview Drive are among the best known in the city; the residential area on the west of Grandview Drive, opposite the river, was added to the National Register of Historic Places as an historic district in 1996.  A large amount of land on the valley side of Grandview Drive is owned by the Peoria Park District and is undeveloped except for park benches.  The district's legal name, "Pleasure Driveway and Park District of Peoria", is a reflection of Grandview Drive's original prominence in the Peoria park system.  Of particular note, the drive is said to have been one of the first "linear parks" of its time.

President Theodore Roosevelt is said to have proclaimed it the "World's Most Beautiful Drive" during a 1910 visit. Though this is more a paraphrase of his sentiments than an exact quote, local legend cites this as fact. Grandview Drive was the original location of WMBD (AM); although the WMBD callsign was assigned in FCC sequence, the callsign is associated with Roosevelt's comment.

Location
Grandview drive stretches from Prospect Road to Illinois Route 29, and is a winding road with several sight-seeing areas.  Along the road is the Peoria Country Club, which includes a golf course and tennis courts.  There is also a large park, known as Grandview Park.

Historic district boundaries
The National Register of Historic Places boundary for The Grand View Drive Historic District is "roughly bounded by Prospect Road in the north, the Illinois River bluffs, Adams Street in the south and the Grand View Drive W. right of way".  However, this description appears to be contradictory, as Grandview Drive runs between Prospect Road and Adams Street (Illinois Route 29), and the description appears to give no northern boundary.

It is near the birthplace of the first gasoline-powered car in America, the Duryea automobile, built in 1893 by Charles Duryea.

Notes

Illinois River
National Register of Historic Places in Peoria County, Illinois
Neighborhoods in Illinois
Parks in Illinois
Protected areas of Peoria County, Illinois
Roads on the National Register of Historic Places in Illinois
Transportation in Peoria County, Illinois
Tourist attractions in Peoria, Illinois
Populated places established in 1906
Historic districts on the National Register of Historic Places in Illinois
1906 establishments in Illinois